Spilotragus xanthus is a species of beetle in the family Cerambycidae. It was described by Karl Jordan in 1903. It is known from Mozambique and the Democratic Republic of the Congo.

References

Tragocephalini
Beetles described in 1903